Means Johnston Jr. (December 5, 1916 – July 14, 1989) was an admiral in the United States Navy.

A native of Mississippi, Johnston graduated from the United States Naval Academy in 1939. During World War II, Johnston commanded a naval base at Rhode Island and a destroyer. After the war, Johnston served as the Navy's Chief of Legislative Affairs and Inspector General during the late 1960s and early 1970s. He later would be promoted at admiral and serve as Commander in Chief, Allied Forces Southern Europe from 1973 to 1975.

He died of prostate cancer in 1989 and was buried at Arlington National Cemetery.

References

External links
 

1916 births
1989 deaths
United States Navy admirals
United States Naval Academy alumni
Burials at Arlington National Cemetery
People from Leflore County, Mississippi
Military personnel from Mississippi
United States Navy Inspectors General
United States Navy personnel of World War II